Nejc Mevlja (born 12 June 1990) is a Slovenian footballer who plays as a centre-back for Gorica.

Career
In January 2012, Mevlja had a traffic accident while driving to the training ground of his club, Gorica. Because of his injuries, he was unable to play for the whole year. On 24 September 2012, he signed for Maribor as a free agent. He returned on 10 March 2013 in a match against Olimpija Ljubljana, when he fully recovered from his injury.

In January 2014, Mevlja joined Scottish Championship side Livingston until the end of the season. He established himself in the starting, making 13 appearances. He scored his only goal for the club in a 2–1 loss against Dumbarton on 29 March 2014. At the end of the season, Mevlja was released by the club.

Personal life
He has a twin brother named Miha, who plays as a defender.

Honours
Maribor
Slovenian First League: 2012–13
Slovenian Cup: 2012–13

Gorica
Slovenian Second League: 2021–22

References

External links
 
 NZS profile 

1990 births
Living people
Slovenian twins
Footballers from Ljubljana
Slovenian footballers
Association football defenders
ND Gorica players
NK Brda players
NK Maribor players
Livingston F.C. players
CS Pandurii Târgu Jiu players
HŠK Zrinjski Mostar players
TSW Pegasus FC players
FC Schaffhausen players
Slovenian PrvaLiga players
Scottish Professional Football League players
Liga I players
Premier League of Bosnia and Herzegovina players
Swiss Challenge League players
Slovenian Second League players
Slovenian expatriate footballers
Expatriate footballers in Scotland
Expatriate footballers in Romania
Expatriate footballers in Bosnia and Herzegovina
Expatriate footballers in Hong Kong
Expatriate footballers in Switzerland
Slovenian expatriate sportspeople in Scotland
Slovenian expatriate sportspeople in Romania
Slovenian expatriate sportspeople in Bosnia and Herzegovina
Slovenian expatriate sportspeople in Switzerland
Slovenia youth international footballers
Slovenia under-21 international footballers